The 2018 Little League World Series was held from August 16 to August 26 at the Little League headquarters complex in South Williamsport, Pennsylvania. Eight teams from the United States and eight teams from around the world competed in the 72nd edition of the tournament. Honolulu Little League of Honolulu, Hawaii defeated South Seoul Little League of Seoul, South Korea in the championship by a 3–0 score.

Teams

Regional qualifying tournaments were held between June and August 2018.

Results

The draw to determine the opening round pairings took place on June 14, 2018.

United States bracket

International bracket

Consolation games
Teams that lose their first two games get to play a consolation game against a team from the other side of the bracket that also lost its first two games. These games are labeled Game A and Game B.

Third place game
This consolation game is played between the runner-up of the United States championship and the runner-up of the International championship.

World Championship

Champions path
The Honolulu LL reached the LLWS with an undefeated record in seven games. In total, their record was 12–0.

MLB Little League Classic
On September 29, 2017, Major League Baseball announced that the second MLB Little League Classic would be played on August 19, 2018, between the New York Mets and Philadelphia Phillies. The game was again played at BB&T Ballpark at Historic Bowman Field, with the Mets winning, 8–2.

References

 
2018
2018 in baseball
2018 in sports in Pennsylvania
August 2018 sports events in the United States
2018 in sports in Texas
2018 in Japanese sport